Ernst Frederich Erwin Ladendorf (born 5 February 1992 in Alberton, South Africa) is a South African rugby union player for the . He can play as a flanker, number eight or a lock.

Career

Sharks

After school, Ladendorf joined the Sharks Academy in Durban. He represented the  side in the 2011 Under-19 Provincial Championship, scoring a try against the s as they finished fifth on the log.

Border Bulldogs

Border finished the season bottom of the log with just two victories in their twelve matches, but a 21–15 victory over  saw them retain their place in Group A of the competition.

Ladendorf was included in the  senior squad for the 2013 Vodacom Cup. In the latter half of the year, he was involved in a disastrous campaign for the  side in the 2013 Under-21 Provincial Championship. He scored a try in their relegation play-off match, to help them to a 23–21 victory against the s for the second year in a row to once again remain in Group A.

Falcons

He made two appearances for the Falcons in the 2014 Vodacom Cup competition. He started all six of their matches in the 2014 Currie Cup qualification series, but the Falcons finished in sixth spot, to qualify to the 2014 Currie Cup First Division.

References

South African rugby union players
Living people
1992 births
People from Alberton, Gauteng
Rugby union locks
Rugby union flankers
Rugby union number eights
Border Bulldogs players
Falcons (rugby union) players
Rugby union players from Gauteng